Unexpected Places may refer to:

 Unexpected Places (2012 film), a film directed by Michael Brennan
 Unexpected Places (1918 film), an American silent comedy-drama film
 Unexpected Places (song), a song by The Academy Is...